Belltable (formerly the Belltable Arts Centre) is a multi-disciplinary arts venue located at 69 O'Connell Street, Limerick, Ireland.  The facility houses a 220-seat theatre/cinema, art gallery, box office, stage, meeting rooms, rehearsal studios and offices. Through "Belltable:Connect" it aims to support the professional development of theatre artists. This includes the hire of rehearsal spaces, hotdesking facilities, office and meeting room spaces, workshops and mentorship programmes.

History
The facility opened in 1981 in what was previously known as The Coliseum and the Redemptorist Confraternity Hall. It was named after Henry Hubert Belltable, a Belgian army officer who founded the Holy Confraternity in Limerick.

In February 2013 it was announced that the company behind the Belltable had gone into liquidation. The liquidation followed a major €1 million refurbishment of the centre. A budget overrun of €300,000 is believed to have been the cause of the company going into liquidation. The centre closed in January 2013.

Since 2013 it has been a regular screening venue for the Richard Harris International Film Festival.

The Belltable theatre reopened in 2016 under management of the Lime Tree Theatre due to a grant from the Arts Council.

There is a café in the basement.

References

External links
 
 

Buildings and structures in Limerick (city)
Arts centres in the Republic of Ireland
Tourist attractions in County Limerick
1981 establishments in Ireland